Ente Italiano per le Audizioni Radiofoniche (EIAR, "Italian Body for Radio Broadcasting") was the public service broadcaster in Fascist Italy and the only entity permitted to broadcast by the government.

History
The company was established in 1927, after the partial takeover of the private radio broadcaster Unione Radiofonica Italiana (URI), which since 1924 had been the only organisation authorized to establish radio transmitters and run radio broadcasts in Italy. Between 1929 and 1939, the EIAR presented the first television broadcasting tests in Italy.

An early signing to the TV station in 1939 was the Italian singer Lia Origoni and a film was made to record her performance.

For most of its existence it was run by Giancarlo Vallauri, although he was replaced as president by Ezio Maria Gray during the Italian Social Republic period.

In October 1944, towards the end of World War II, the entity was replaced with Radio Audizioni Italiane (RAI).

See also
Radio Bari

References

External links

History of EIAR (in Italian)

Organizations established in 1927
Organizations disestablished in 1944
Publicly funded broadcasters
Government agencies of Italy
Radio stations established in 1927
1927 establishments in Italy
1944 disestablishments in Italy
State media
Former state media